Omre may refer to:

 Arthur Omre (1887–1967), Norwegian novelist and writer of short stories
 The OMRE OE-01, a 1951 Hungarian experimental high performance sailplane